The Healthy, Hunger-Free Kids Act of 2010 is a federal statute signed into law by President Barack Obama on December 13, 2010.  The law is part of the reauthorization of funding for child nutrition (see the original Child Nutrition Act). It funded child nutrition programs and free lunch programs in schools for 5 years.  In addition, the law set new nutrition standards for schools, and allocated $4.5 billion for their implementation.  The new nutrition standards were a centerpiece of First Lady Michelle Obama's Let's Move! initiative to combat childhood obesity. In FY 2011, federal spending totaled $10.1 billion for the National School Lunch Program. The Healthy, Hunger-Free Kids Act allows USDA, for the first time in 30 years, opportunity to make real reforms to the school lunch and breakfast programs by improving the critical nutrition and hunger safety net for millions of children. Healthy, Hunger-Free Kids Act and Michelle Obama were a step in transforming the food pyramid recommendation, which has been around since the early 1990s, into what is now known as "MyPlate".

According to the US Department of Agriculture, for the 2012–13 school year, 21.5 million American children received free lunch or reduced-price lunch at school. Across the U.S, the school lunch program varies by state.

In December 2018, the USDA weakened the ability to enforce the Act.

Legislative history 
The bill was introduced in the US Senate by Blanche Lincoln (D-AR), Chairwoman of the Senate Agriculture Committee. It was later approved by the Senate by unanimous voice vote on August 5, 2010. In the U.S. House of Representatives The Healthy, Hunger-Free Kids Act passed with 247 Democrats and 17 Republicans voting for, and 4 Democrats and 153 Republicans voting against it. President Barack Obama signed the bill into law on December 13, 2010. The Healthy, Hunger-Free Kids Act took effect in 2014. Senators Charles Schumer, (D-NY) and Kirsten Gillibrand, (D-NY) pushed for Greek yogurt, much of which is manufactured in Utica, NY, to be included in the regulations determining acceptable proteins to be served at school.

Provisions 
The Healthy, Hunger-Free Kids Act allows the U.S. Department of Agriculture (USDA) to make significant changes to the school lunch program for the first time in over 30 years.   
In addition to funding standard child nutrition and school lunch programs, there are several new nutritional standards in the bill.  The main aspects are listed below.

New Food Standards
 Gives USDA the authority to set new standards for food sold in lunches during the regular day, including vending machines.
 Authorizes additional funds for the new standards for federally-subsidized school lunches.
 Provides resources for schools and communities to utilize local farms and gardens to provide fresh produce.
 Provides resources to increase nutritional quality of food provided by USDA
 Sets minimum standards for school wellness policies
 Limits milk served to nonfat flavored milk or 1 percent white milk
Reduced portion sizes in meals
Mandate a minimum on fruit, vegetables, and whole grain servings
Mandate a maximum sodium, sugar, and fat content

Increases access 
 Increased the number of eligible children for school meal programs by 115,000
 Uses census data to determine student need in high-poverty areas, rather than relying on paper applications.
 Authorizes USDA to provide meals in more after-school programs in "high-risk" areas
 Increases access to drinking water in schools

Program monitoring 
 Requires school districts to be audited every 3 years to see if they have met nutrition standards
 Requires easier access for students and parents about nutritional facts of meals
 Improves recall procedures for school food
 Provides training for school lunch providers

Criticism
A YouTube video, produced by Wallace High School students in Kansas drew national attention and over 1.5 million views. The video complained of its students being "hungry" and not fed well enough to participate in their extracurricular activities or sports due to reduced portion sizes relative to those prior to the new law.  In response to viewing the video, nutrition specialists explained that before the new standards were implemented, some schools may have been serving a lot of protein to keep their customers happy, "but none of us need as much protein as a lot of us eat". The experts also explained that eating 850 calories at lunch is enough for most high schoolers. Along with the viral video, other students are reaching out on other forms of social media by using the hashtag 'ThanksMichelleObama'. Sam Kass, the executive director of Let's Move! and senior policy adviser for Nutrition shared "We've seen the photos being tweeted, but we don't dictate the food that schools serve-school districts do." A study done by Harvard School of Public Health discovered that about 60 percent of vegetables and roughly 40 percent of fresh fruit are thrown away due to no interest. Overall, the amount of food students did not eat but threw away instead increased by 56 percent. As of 2017, Harvard School of Public Health determined that food waste had not increased by a measurable percentage as a result of the Healthy, Hunger-Free Kids Act. One of the biggest points of criticism for Healthy, Hunger-Free Kids Act is meal participation, and the participation has not increased, but decreased. The program has declined by nearly 4 percent and some schools have lost revenue due to the decline in participation, therefore, many are choosing to opt out of the program as a whole.

In response to the criticism, the USDA issued modified standards which were intended to be more flexible.

Success 
The Healthy, Hunger-Free Kids Act provides meals to children that normally could not afford those nutritious food items. It also allows schools to have more resources that they may not have had before. A study in Virginia and Massachusetts concluded that children in schools were eating significantly healthier meals when their parents or guardians were not choosing their food, but the school was. While looking at the nutrition value of 1.7 million meals selected by 7,200 students in three middle and three high schools in an urban school district in Washington state, where the data was collected and compared in the 16 months before the standards were carried out with data collected in the 15 months after implementation; the information found that there was an increase in six nutrients: fiber, iron, calcium, vitamin A, vitamin C, and protein. While providing new meals with improvements in fruits, vegetables, amount of variety, and portion sizes, the calorie intake has also transformed. The energy density ration was 1.65 before Healthy, Hunger-Free Kids Act compared to the new number of 1.44 after.

Flexibility
On December 6, 2018, US Secretary of Agriculture Sonny Perdue announced a new rule which froze the Act's progressively lowering limits on sodium, while also allowing for the sale of 1% flavored milks and fewer whole grain-rich foods in school breakfast and school lunch options.

References

External links
 Public Law 111–296 111th Congress

Acts of the 111th United States Congress
School meal programs in the United States